The Tree of Life is a  sculpture of a baobab tree at Disney's Animal Kingdom, Walt Disney World Resort. It has over 8,000 branches of very different sizes and about 102,000 artificial leaves. It debuted when the attraction opened on April 22, 1998. Inspired by the mythological concept, the Tree of Life features 325 carvings of existing and extinct animal species on its trunk and surrounding roots; after Jane Goodall's visit, her famous subject David Graybeard was carved into the tree. The sculpture took 18 months to create. Designed and fabricated at Greens Bayou Fabrication Yard in Houston and based on the natural forms of baobab trees, the Tree of Life is located on Discovery Island, roughly in the center of the park. The tree features over 100,000 thermoplastic kynar leaves. At the structure's interior base is a 428-seat theater that hosts It's Tough to Be a Bug!, a 3-D film attraction based on the 1998 Disney/Pixar film A Bug's Life. There is also a secret path that park goers can walk up to take a close look at the sculpture.

Tree of Life Awakenings
The Tree of Life Awakenings is a series of projection mapping shows that debuted on May 27, 2016, as part of the park's new nighttime operating hours. A media preview of the show was presented on April 19, 2016. Four presentations are featured throughout the evening, which have been given names on the Rivers of Light soundtrack release: 
 Journey: A playful deer and a watchful hawk.
 Rendezvous: A hummingbird and flowers.
 Gift Giver: A red fox in a winter setting.
 Disney Medley: Animal imagery inspired by Pocahontas, Bambi, Dinosaur, Tarzan, Finding Nemo, Avatar, The Jungle Book, Brother Bear, and The Lion King.
Since then the park has added:

 First Snow (Holidays only, started 2019) 

 Northern Lights (Holidays only, started 2019)

 A new Lion King only projection (October 2021).

References

External links

 

Disney's Animal Kingdom
Discovery Island (Disney's Animal Kingdom)
Walt Disney Parks and Resorts icons
1998 establishments in Florida
Buildings and structures completed in 1998
Artificial trees

fr:Tree of Life